WLFC (88.3 FM) is a radio station licensed to North Baltimore, Ohio, United States, the station serves The University of Findlay.  The station is currently owned by The University of Findlay.

History 
WLFC-FM is a noncommercial radio station that has been serving the people of Hancock County since 1973. The station was begun by business major Bill Rumbold and religion major Stan Morthart and began operating as WVFC during the spring of 1971. At this point, WVFC was a carrier current station available in some residence halls at 560 AM. On November 1, 1973 this station was born and became WLFC-FM and operated at a power of 10 watts on 88.3 MHz. On January 23, 1982 WLFC began operating in stereo at 155 watts ERP. On Oct. 9, 2010 WLFC moved to a new transmitter site and increased power up to 4600 watts.

DJs

Management

Jacob Hanzlik-General Manager

Air Talent

Ashley Hoy (General Manager)
Amy Bolton (DJ Bolt)
Chris Corso
Noah Ferris
Jacob Sarver
Kelsey Sweatt
Hope Brant
Joe Stiener
Rob Wood

References

External links

LFC